Cowboy is a 1958 American Western film directed by Delmer Daves and starring Glenn Ford, Jack Lemmon, Anna Kashfi and Brian Donlevy. This film is an adaptation of the Frank Harris semi-autobiographical novel My Reminiscences as a Cowboy. Lemmon's character is based on Harris. The opening animated title sequence was created by Saul Bass. The screenwriters were Edmund H. North and Dalton Trumbo - the latter received no screen credit at the time because he had been blacklisted as one of the Hollywood Ten.

Plot
Frank Harris (Jack Lemmon) is a Chicago hotel clerk who dreams of making his fortune in the cattle business and has also fallen in love with Maria, the daughter of hotel guest and Mexican cattle baron, Señor Vidal. When Señor Vidal finds out about the relationship, he orders Harris to stay away and arranges to return immediately to Mexico with his daughter.

Meanwhile, Tom Reece (Glenn Ford), an experienced trail boss, finishes a cattle drive and takes over an entire wing of the hotel, as usual. He makes a deal to buy cattle from Vidal in Mexico. However, when Reece loses his money in a poker game, Harris sees his opportunity to better himself (and see Maria again) – he offers his entire life savings for a partnership in Reece's next drive, including his joining the drive. Reece in desperation accepts on the basis that the profits are shared 50:50.

The next morning, when Harris shows up, Reece tries to renege, not wanting to burden himself with an inexperienced greenhornish tenderfoot as a partner, but Harris holds him to their deal. As they travel to Vidal's ranch, the cowboy life on the trail is not what Harris had envisioned. Harris is upset when one of the hands is killed by a rattlesnake bite during some fooling around by two other hands. Reece, still upset about having Harris along, continues to treat him harshly, but Harris toughens up and Reece starts taking a liking to him.

When they reach their destination, Harris is devastated to learn that Maria has been married off by her father to Don Manuel Arriega. When Arriega sees them together, he warns Harris to keep away. During a fiesta, Arriega performs a dangerous stunt, placing a ring on a bull's horn from his horse, and challenges the Americans to do the same. Harris takes up his challenge, but Reece intercedes to protect Harris from himself. Reece confronts the bull on foot so as not to endanger his horse and succeeds in the task.

On the cattle drive back to Chicago, Maria's marriage eats away at Harris. He becomes as callous and hostile to others as Reece had previously been to him. At one point, Reece stampedes the herd in order to save Harris from a Comanche ambush while he is out alone rounding up strays. Reece is shot in the knee, and Harris takes over as trail boss while he recovers. Harris tells Reece that the 200 head of cattle that were lost in the stampede are all coming out of Reece's share. Harris drives the men hard. Reece offers advice, but Harris refuses to listen. When one of the hands, a former US marshal, kills one of his friends while drinking together and then takes his own life, Harris callously orders the men back to work. Later Reece saves Harris's life after he foolishly enters a crowded cattle car on the train where one steer is lying down and in danger of being trampled. Knowing Reece has saved him, Harris snaps out of his resentful mood and suggests that the lost cattle be shared 50/50.

At the end of the drive, they boisterously take over part of the hotel where Harris used to work, much to the surprise of his former boss.

Trivia

In the scene in a mansion-house on the main stair there is a painting on the main stair which appears to portray John Wayne.

Cast

Home media
The film was released on DVD in Region 1 by Sony Pictures Home Entertainment on May 14, 2002.
The Film was released on Blu-Ray from Twilight Time, albeit in a limited quantity on February 16, 2016.

Award nominations
Al Clark and William A. Lyon were nominated for the Academy Award for Best Film Editing in 1958, while Daves was nominated for a Directors Guild of America Award for Outstanding Directorial Achievement in Motion Pictures.

See also
 List of American films of 1958

References

External links
 
 
 
 
 

1958 Western (genre) films
1958 films
American Western (genre) films
Columbia Pictures films
1950s English-language films
Films based on Western (genre) novels
Films directed by Delmer Daves
Films scored by George Duning
Films set in Chicago
Films shot in New Mexico
Films with screenplays by Dalton Trumbo
1950s American films